Audris Joel Pérez (born December 23, 1988) is a Dominican professional baseball catcher for the Evansville Otters of the Frontier League. He previously played in Major League Baseball (MLB) for the St. Louis Cardinals.

Career

St. Louis Cardinals
After joining the Cardinals organization in 2008, Pérez appeared for the GCL Cardinals and DSL Cardinals. In 2009, Pérez played for the Rookie league Johnson City Cardinals. In 2010, Pérez played for the short-season A-ball Batavia Muckdogs. In 2011, he spent time between the advanced-A ball Palm Beach Cardinals and AA Springfield Cardinals. Pérez spent the entire 2012 season in AA with Springfield. Pérez began 2013 with Springfield and received a promotion to the AAA Memphis Redbirds in July.

Pérez was called up to the majors for the first time on September 3, 2013. Pérez only appeared in 3 games for the Cardinals over 2013 and 2014 before being outrighted off of the roster on September 10, 2014. He elected free agency on November 3.

Colorado Rockies
On November 19, 2014, Pérez signed a minor league deal with the Colorado Rockies and received an invitation to Spring Training.

Baltimore Orioles
On March 31, 2015, Pérez was traded to the Baltimore Orioles. He spent the year with the AAA Norfolk Tides.  Pérez was invited to 2016 Spring Training with Baltimore but did not make the team and would spend the season in Norfolk. He was invited to 2017 Spring Training but would not make the team again and would spend the year between Norfolk and the AA Bowie Baysox. He elected free agency on November 6, 2017 and resigned on a new minor league deal on February 1, 2018. He played for Bowie and Norfolk in 2018 before electing free agency on November 3, 2018.

Ottawa Titans
On November 20, 2020, Pérez signed with the Ottawa Titans of the Frontier League. On December 28, 2020, Pérez was released.

Evansville Otters
On December 1, 2021, Pérez signed with the Evansville Otters of the Frontier League.

References

External links

1988 births
Living people
People from San Cristóbal Province
Dominican Republic expatriate baseball players in the United States
Major League Baseball players from the Dominican Republic
Major League Baseball catchers
St. Louis Cardinals players
Gulf Coast Cardinals players
Johnson City Cardinals players
Batavia Muckdogs players
Palm Beach Cardinals players
Springfield Cardinals players
Memphis Redbirds players
Dominican Summer League Cardinals players
Águilas Cibaeñas players
Bowie Baysox players
Norfolk Tides players
Estrellas Orientales players
Leones del Escogido players
Baseball players at the 2019 Pan American Games
Pan American Games competitors for the Dominican Republic